The United Coalition Party (KTK), also known as the Improving I-Kiribati Welfare Party, was a political party in Kiribati.

History
The party was established in August 2010 as a merger of the Kiribati Independent Party and Protect the Maneaba. The new party held 12 seats, making it the largest opposition faction, resulting in its leader Rimeta Beniamina being appointed Leader of the Opposition. However, she later defected to the Maurin Kiribati Party (MKP).

In the 2011 parliamentary elections it won ten seats, and was able to nominate Tetaua Taitai for the 2012 presidential elections. Taitai finished second with 35% of the vote.

In January 2016 it merged with the MKP to form the Tobwaan Kiribati Party.

References

Defunct political parties in Kiribati
2010 establishments in Kiribati
Political parties established in 2010
2016 disestablishments in Kiribati
Political parties disestablished in 2016